The Women's downhill competition at the 2017 World Championships was held on Sunday, 12 February 2017.

Slovenia's Ilka Štuhec won the gold medal, Stephanie Venier of Austria took the silver, and the bronze medalist was Lindsey Vonn of the United States.

Results
The race started at 11:15 CET (UTC+1).

References

Women's downhill
2017 in Swiss women's sport
FIS